Aspire is a work of art, constructed on the Jubilee Campus of the University of Nottingham, in Nottingham, England. It is taller than B of the Bang (which was dismantled in 2009), Nelson's Column, the Angel of the North, and the Statue of Liberty (excluding the pedestal). The name Aspire was chosen after a competition to name the sculpture, which was open to staff and students at the university.

Design and fabrication 

Aspire is a type of hyperboloid structure, designed by Ken Shuttleworth and Make Architects. The sculpture weighs 854 tonnes, and cost £800,000, which was donated by an anonymous benefactor. The sculpture is lit during the hours of darkness.

Fabrication of the sculpture took 23 weeks and was completed by Watson Steel Structures Ltd in Bolton, Greater Manchester. It was then transported to Widnes, Cheshire, where Merseyside Coatings Ltd applied the distinctive red and orange colour scheme. The structure was fabricated in three parts and lifted onto the concrete foundation by cranes on-site.

References

University of Nottingham
Outdoor sculptures in England
Buildings and structures in Nottingham
Hyperboloid structures
Steel sculptures in England
Tourist attractions in Nottingham
2008 sculptures